

See also
Adelphi (disambiguation)
Philadelphia
Adelphia, New Jersey
Adelphia (album), a 2009 album by A Skylit Drive
Adelphia (moth), a genus of moths
Adelphia (plant), a genus of woody-vined flowering plants
Adelphia Coliseum or Nissan Stadium
Adelphia College, a college in Seattle, Washington
Adelphia Communications Corporation, a defunct cable television company
Adelphia School, a Howell Township Public School
Sarcophagus of Adelphia: 4th century paleo-Christian sarcophagus found near Siracusa, Sicily

Genus disambiguation pages